Isak Elbogen (23 November 1812, Smíchov – 29 August 1883, Vienna), was a rabbi from Bohemia (now in the Czech Republic). He worked in the synagogue in Smíchov and for almost his entire professional career as a regional rabbi of the Jewish community in Jungbunzlau (now Mladá Boleslav), then one of the most important in Bohemia.

Early life and education
He was born into the family of Rabbi Josef Elbogen and his wife Ludmilla in Smíchov. He had two brothers – Jakob and Lazar, and four sisters – Anna, Rosalia, Amalie and Johanna.

He first studied at the local grammar school, and between 1834 and 1836 completed a three-year degree course at Charles-Ferdinand University in Prague,  graduating in 1841 as Doctor of Philosophy. Around this time he also received semicha (rabbinic ordination) from the beth din in Prague, which was led by Rabbi Samuel Lobe Kauder.

Career
Elbogen first worked in his native Smíchov (now part of Prague but, until 1922, an independent town with its own Jewish community), In 1843 he left Smíchov to  become regional rabbi in Mladá Boleslav where he worked for 37 years, retiring in 1880. He died three years later in Vienna and is buried at the Vienna Central Cemetery.

Works
Elbogen was known an expert on the Talmud and the Mishnah. His book שעשועום בחדרי המשנה מענה הדות ששה סדרי משנה (Šauším behadrej hamišná meanná hidot šišá sidrej mišná) was published in Prague in 1865. He also wrote a selicha commemorating the great fire of the Mladá Boleslav Jewish Quarter and the synagogue on Shabbat, 28 May 1859 entitled סליחות לזכרון האש אשר יצאה ביער יונגבונצלויא בים שבתקקועש ("Penitential prayers to the memory of the terrible fire that engulfed the city of Mladá Boleslav  on the holy Sabbath day twenty-fourth Iyar of the year 1859"), which, until its destruction just before the Second World War, was read aloud annually in Mladá Boleslav synagogue.

Personal and family life
He married Friederike Pokorny (1825; Jičín, Bohemia – 1906; Schloss Thalheim, Kapelln, Austria). They had a son, Guido Elbogen, who went into banking and became President of the Anglo-Austrian Bank in Vienna.  Guido's son Heinrich was a sports shooter who represented Austria in the 1912 Summer Olympics. Guido's daughter Jenny Weleminsky was an Esperantist and translator, whose work was published in the Budapest Esperanto-language magazine, Literatura Mondo.

References

1812 births
1883 deaths
19th-century Czech rabbis
Burials at the Vienna Central Cemetery
Charles University alumni
People from Mladá Boleslav
People from Smíchov
Rabbis from Prague
Elbogen family